Juan Cruz may refer to:
 Juan Cruz (baseball) (born 1978), Dominican pitcher
 Juan Cruz (director) (born 1966), Spanish screenwriter and film director
 Juan Aubín Cruz Manzano (born 1948), Puerto Rican politician and mayor of Manatí since 1977
 Juan R. Cruz (born 1946), Puerto Rican aerospace engineer at the National Aeronautics and Space Administration
 Juan Lazo Cruz (born 1977), Salvadoran football midfielder
 Juan Cruz (footballer, born 1992), Spanish footballer
 Juan Cruz Bolado (born 1997), Argentine footballer
 Juan Cruz (footballer, born 2000), Spanish footballer
 Juan Cruz Real (born 1976), Argentine footballer and manager

See also